This is a list of events from British radio in 1957.

Events
 2 September – The BBC Light Programme starts broadcasting at breakfast and now goes on-air each day, apart from Sunday, at 7am.
 30 September – 
Network Three launches, providing a service of adult educational programmes. It broadcasts on the frequencies of the Third programme, and is on air for 75 minutes each day, resulting in the Third Programme coming on air a little later in the evening.
The BBC Home Service's lighter content transfers to the Light Programme.
 September – For the first time, a chart rundown is broadcast on the  when the format of running through the charts of the week, playing the top tens from various music papers plus entries to top 20s, is introduced as part of Pick of the Pops.
 28 October – The Today programme launches on the BBC Home Service as a programme of "topical talks" to give listeners an alternative to listening to light music which the Home Service had previously broadcast at breakfast.

Programme debuts
 1 January – My Word!, series run, on the BBC Home Service (1957–1988)
 April – The Clitheroe Kid, series run, on the BBC Home Service (1957–1972)
 Summer – Test Match Special on the BBC Third Programme (1957–Present)
 28 October – The Today Programme on the BBC Home Service (1957–Present)

Continuing radio programmes
1930s
 In Town Tonight (1933–1960)

1940s
 Music While You Work (1940–1967)
 Sunday Half Hour (1940–2018)
 Desert Island Discs (1942–Present)
 Family Favourites (1945–1980)
 Down Your Way (1946–1992)
 Have A Go (1946–1967)
 Housewives' Choice (1946–1967)
 Letter from America (1946–2004)
 Woman's Hour (1946–Present)
 Twenty Questions (1947–1976)
 Any Questions? (1948–Present)
 Mrs Dale's Diary (1948–1969)
 Take It from Here (1948–1960)
 Billy Cotton Band Show (1949–1968)
 A Book at Bedtime (1949–Present)
 Ray's a Laugh (1949–1961)

1950s
 The Archers (1950–Present)
 Educating Archie (1950–1960)
 Listen with Mother (1950–1982)
 The Goon Show (1951–1960)
 Hancock's Half Hour (1954–1959)
 From Our Own Correspondent (1955–Present)
 Pick of the Pops'' (1955–Present)

Station debuts
 30 September – Network Three

Births
 9 July – Paul Merton, né Martin, comic performer and broadcast panel show participant
 24 August – Stephen Fry, actor and broadcast panel show participant
 7 August – Daire Brehan, Irish-born actress, broadcaster and barrister (died 2012)
 13 September – Sally Boazman, BBC Radio 2 travel news reporter
 3 October – Tim Westwood, DJ
 24 November – Edward Stourton, radio news presenter
 7 December – Winifred Robinson, radio presenter
 9 December – Maria McErlane, comedy actress
 Approximate date – Garry Richardson, radio sports presenter

Deaths
22 July – Robert Moreton, actor, scriptwriter and comedian, suicide (born 1922)

See also 
 1957 in British music
 1957 in British television
 1957 in the United Kingdom
 List of British films of 1957

References 

 
Years in British radio
Radio